Keith Liddell is a mathematician and author. He holds the record for the "fastest punch" in the Guinness World Records. The punch was registered at 45 miles per hour. In 2012, he qualified for the summer Olympics in London, United Kingdom.

Bibliography
 The Tangibility of Nothingness (2011)

References

Year of birth missing (living people)
Living people
American male boxers
Boxers from Chicago
Sports world record holders
Sportswriters from Illinois